Hôtel Alexandre also known as Hôtel Soult is a hôtel particulier in the 8th arrondissement of Paris, France designed by French architect Étienne-Louis Boullée. The building was constructed from 1763 to 1766 and is the best surviving structure designed by Boullée.

History

Construction 
The hôtel particulier was commissioned by André-Claude-Nicolas Alexandre, a French financer. Boullée began designing the building at age 35, making it one of his earliest projects.

A mansard roof was later adder to the building, replacing the original rooftop terrace.

Heritage designation 
The building was listed as a Monument historique on 4 November 1927.

2001 addition 

In 2001 the building was incorporated into the atrium of a contemporary office building designed by Delaage Tsiropoulos Architecture Carvunis Cholet to serve as the headquarters of Suez.

Gallery

References 

Buildings and structures in the 8th arrondissement of Paris
Hôtels particuliers in Paris
Monuments historiques of Paris